The Wetetnagami River is a tributary of the south shore of Nicobi Lake flowing in Quebec, in Canada, overlapping the administrative areas of:
Abitibi-Témiscamingue: in Senneterre, Quebec;
Nord-du-Québec: in Eeyou Istchee Baie-James.

This river successively crosses the townships of Charrette, Adhémar, Labrie, Moquin, Effiat and Muy. The surface of the Wetetnagami River is generally frozen from early December to late April. Forestry is the main economic activity of the sector; recreational tourism activities, second.

The Wetetnagami River Valley is served by the R1015 forest road (North-South direction) and the R1051 (East-West direction).

The territory of the reserve feeds the Wetetnagami River, as well as the lake of the same name and Lake Achepabanca. Many recreational and tourist activities are allowed on this reserve.

Geography

History 
Formerly this territory was occupied according to the periods by the Attikameks, the Algonquins and the Cree.

The toponym "Wetetnagami River" was made official on December 5, 1968, at the Commission de toponymie du Québec, when it was created.

See also

References

External links 

Rivers of Abitibi-Témiscamingue
Rivers of Nord-du-Québec
Nottaway River drainage basin
Val-d'Or
Eeyou Istchee James Bay